The Corsetry and Underwear Journal was a British corsetry and underwear industry trade magazine of which Emily Yooll was the editor from 1935 to 1975 and Edith Base was a formerly editor in 1950.

References

Business magazines published in the United Kingdom
Corsetry
Defunct magazines published in the United Kingdom
Professional and trade magazines
Magazines with year of establishment missing
Magazines with year of disestablishment missing